Iravum Pagalum is a 1965 Indian Tamil-language crime thriller film directed by Joseph Thaliath Jr. The film stars then newcomers Jaishankar and C. Vasantha, while S. A. Ashokan, Nagesh, Ganthimathi and Pandari Bai play supporting roles. A college student's house is robbed, and his mother prevents him from reporting it to the police. Suspicious, he sets out to unravel the mystery behind his mother's silence. The film was released on 14 January 1965 and became a commercial success.

Plot 

Rajasekar is a wealthy college student who lives with his widowed mother Maragadhavalli and leads an untroubled life; he is in love with Parimala, his classmate. One night, Rajasekar and Maragadhavalli are robbed of their wealth by a gang; as Maragadhavalli prevents Rajasekar from reporting this incident to the police, he himself sets out to unravel the mystery behind his mother's silence.

Cast 

Male cast
 Jaishankar as Rajasekar
 Ashokan as Govindan
 Ramdas as the calvary leader
 Nagesh as Balu
 Baskar as Gopal
 Viswanthan as the office manager
Male support cast
 Ennathe Kannaiah, Muthukoorthan, Prabhakar,Vasanthan, P. K. S. Mani, and Master Sridar.

Female cast
 C. Vasantha as Parimala
 Ganthimathi as Chandra
 Pandari Bai as Maragadhavalli
 Mallika as Kamala's mother
 Baby Bhavani as Kamala
 Ramamani Bai as the maid
Dance
 Sakunthala

Production 
Joseph Thaliath Jr. set up a production company named "Citadel Films", the name being inspired by the A. J. Cronin novel The Citadel. He wanted to adapt that novel into a Tamil film, but Citadel Films co-founder F. Nagoor dissuaded him from doing so as he felt the subject was "risky". He instead suggested a crime thriller, which became Iravum Pagalum. Due to the film's low budget, Joseph chose to cast newcomers. Joseph cast theatre actor Subramaniam Shankar in the lead role, christening him Jaishankar and marking the actor's cinematic acting debut. C. Vasantha was cast as the female lead, also making her cinematic acting debut. Thengai Srinivasan was also cast in what would have been his film debut, but was removed after distributors were not supportive of him. Suruli Rajan, in his film debut, appeared uncredited. The film was produced by Joseph Thomas under the Citadel banner, photographed by B. B. Lucas, and edited by P. Radhakrishnan and M. Vellaisaamy.

Soundtrack 
The soundtrack album was composed by T. R. Pappa. The lyrics were written by Alangudi Somu.

Release and reception 
Iravum Pagalum was released on 14 January 1965, Pongal day. Despite facing competition from other Pongal releases such as Enga Veettu Pillai and Pazhani, the film became a commercial success. The Indian Express said on 6 February 1965, "Iravum Pagalum, despite a muddled script, is above the level of the run-of-the-mill suspense thrillers and has obvious box office potential".

References

External links 
 

1960s crime thriller films
1960s Tamil-language films
1965 films
Films directed by Joseph Thaliath Jr.
Films scored by T. R. Pappa
Indian crime thriller films